The Bach-Jahrbuch ("Bach yearbook" or according to the publication's website "Bach Annals") is an annual publication related to the composer Bach.
It is published in German by the Neue Bachgesellschaft in Leipzig. It is the most respected publication for international Bach research.

The Bach-Jahrbuch contains contributions of notable Bach scholars related to recent research of Bach and his family. It also provides a Bach bibliography.  Begun in 1904, it is the oldest periodical dedicated to one composer.

The first editor was the musicologist Arnold Schering from 1904. The present editor is Peter Wollny.

Editors 
 Arnold Schering (1904–1939)
 Max Schneider (1940–1952)
 Alfred Dürr and Werner Neumann (1953–1974)
 Hans-Joachim Schulze and Christoph Wolff (1975–2005)
 Peter Wollny (from 2005)

External links 

 
 Neue Bachgesellschaft

Annual publications
Classical music publications